Banainia is an ancient village located in the Saraigarh Bhaptiyahi C.D. block of Supaul district in Bihar, India.

References

Villages in Supaul district